Donnie Yen Ji-dan (born 27 July 1963) is a Hong Kong actor, martial artist, and action director. Regarded as one of Hong Kong's top action stars, Yen is widely credited for bringing mixed martial arts (MMA) into mainstream Asian cinema by choreographing MMA in many of his films since the early 2000s. The first Chinese UFC champion Zhang Weili stated that Yen's films introduced her to MMA. Yen has displayed skill in an array of martial arts, being well-versed in Tai Chi, Boxing, Kickboxing, Jeet Kune Do, Hapkido, Mixed martial arts, Taekwondo, Karate, Muay Thai, Wrestling, Brazilian jiu-jitsu, Hung Ga, Sanda, Judo, Wing Chun, and Wushu. One of the most popular film stars in Asia of the early 2000s, Yen is consistently one of the highest-paid actors in Asia. Yen earned HK$220 million (US$28.4 million) from four films and six advertisements in 2013.

Yen is credited by many for contributing to the popularisation of Wing Chun in China. He portrays Wing Chun grandmaster Ip Man in the Ip Man film series, which has garnered box office success and led to an increase in the number of people taking up Wing Chun, with hundreds of new Wing Chun schools being opened up in mainland China and other parts of Asia. Ip Chun, the eldest son of Ip Man, even mentioned that he is grateful to Yen for making his family's art popular and allowing his father's legacy to be remembered. He has also gained international recognition for playing Chirrut Îmwe in Rogue One (2016) and Xiang in XXX: Return of Xander Cage (2017), as well as Commander Tung in Mulan (2020) and Caine in John Wick: Chapter 4 (2023).

Early life

Yen was born on 27 July 1963 in Guangzhou, Guangdong, China. His mother, Bow-sim Mark, is a Fu Style Wudangquan (internal martial arts) and Tai Chi grandmaster, while his father, Klyster Yen (甄雲龍), was a newspaper editor. When he was two years old, his family moved to Hong Kong and then to the United States, settling in Boston when he was 11. He attended Newton North High School.

His younger sister, Chris Yen, is also a martial artist and actress, and appeared in the 2007 film Adventures of Johnny Tao: Rock Around the Dragon.

At a young age, under the influence of his mother, Yen developed an interest in martial arts and began experimenting with various styles, including t'ai chi and other traditional Chinese martial arts. At age 16, Yen began practising Wushu after his parents sent him to Beijing to train with the Beijing Wushu Team.

When Yen decided to return to the United States, he made a side-trip to Hong Kong, where he met action choreographer Yuen Woo-ping.

Yen also came from a family of musicians. His mother is a soprano, in addition to being a martial arts teacher in Boston, while his father is a violinist. From a young age, he was taught by his parents to play musical instruments, including the piano. He also knows Hip-Hop Dancing and Breakdancing.

Career

Beginnings to the 1990s 
Yen's first step into the film industry was when he landed his first starring role in the 1984 film Drunken Tai Chi.

After filming Drunken Tai Chi and Tiger Cage (1988), Yen made his breakthrough role as General Nap-lan in Once Upon a Time in China II (1992), which included a fight scene between his character and Wong Fei-hung (played by Jet Li). Yen had a starring role in the film Iron Monkey in 1993. Yen and Li appeared together again in the 2002 film Hero, where Yen played a spear (or qiang) fighter who fought with Li's character, an unnamed swordsman. The film was nominated for Best Foreign Language Film at the 2003 Academy Awards.

In 1995, Yen starred as Chen Zhen in the television series Fist of Fury produced by ATV, which is adapted from the 1972 film of the same title that starred Bruce Lee as Chen Zhen. Yen reprised his role as Chen Zhen in the 2010 film Legend of the Fist: The Return of Chen Zhen.

In 1997, Yen started the production company Bullet Films, and made his directorial debut in Legend of the Wolf (1997) and Ballistic Kiss (1998), in which he played the lead character. At age 34, Yen almost went bankrupt. Films produced by his own production company and directed by him were critically acclaimed but did not do well at the box office. Yen was forced to borrow money from loan sharks and his production crew to get by.

2000s: Breakthrough success 
Yen later went back to the United States, where he was invited to choreograph fight scenes in Hollywood films, such as Highlander: Endgame (2000) and Blade II (2002). His choreography and skills impressed the directors, and they invited him for cameo appearances in both movies.

In 2002, Jet Li was filming the movie Hero and insisted to the director (Zhang Yimou) that he wanted Yen to play the role of Sky, his adversary, due to Yen's martial arts ability. Li personally invited Yen back from Hollywood to star in the movie, marking the second time the two actors appeared onscreen together since Once Upon a Time in China II ten years earlier. In 2003, Yen played one of the antagonists against Jackie Chan and Owen Wilson in Shanghai Knights.

Yen choreographed most of the fight animation in the 2004 video game Onimusha 3, which featured actors Takeshi Kaneshiro and Jean Reno. Yen continued to be active in Hong Kong cinema in the 2000s, starring as Chu Zhaonan in Tsui Hark's wuxia epic film Seven Swords, and as Ma Kwun in Wilson Yip's brutal crime drama film SPL: Sha Po Lang in 2005. Both films were featured at the 2005 Toronto International Film Festival. Later that year, Yen co-starred with Nicholas Tse and Shawn Yue in Wilson Yip's Dragon Tiger Gate, an adaptation of Wong Yuk-long's manhua series Oriental Heroes. Yen also worked as action choreographer in Stormbreaker, starring Alex Pettyfer. Yen continued to work with Wilson Yip in Flash Point (2007), in which he starred as the lead character and served as producer and action choreographer for the film. He won the award for Best Action Choreography at the Golden Horse Film Awards and the Hong Kong Film Awards for his performance in Flash Point.

In 2008, Yen starred in Ip Man, a semi-biographical account of Ip Man, the Wing Chun master of Bruce Lee. Ip Man marked Yen's fourth collaboration with director Wilson Yip, reuniting him with his co-stars in SPL: Sha Po Lang, Sammo Hung and Simon Yam. Ip Man became the biggest box office hit to date featuring Yen in the leading role, grossing HK$25 million in Hong Kong and 100 million yuan in China.

From 2010 to 2015 
In August 2011, while Yen was on a vacation with his family in the United States, he reportedly received an invitation by producer Avi Lerner to star in The Expendables 2. It was stated that Yen was considering the offer, had many films at hand, and would wait until deciding whether the script appealed to him. Later on, Yen revealed to the Hong Kong media that he had rejected the role.

In 2011, Yen revealed that he was venturing into other genres of movies and had taken up two comedy roles in a row, in All's Well, Ends Well 2011 and All's Well, Ends Well 2012, and would be working with Carina Lau in the former and Sandra Ng in the latter. Both films obtained huge critical and box-office success and proved Yen's versatility as an actor.

Yen took a six-month break in the second half of 2011 after the filming of The Monkey King 3D, explaining that he wanted to spend more time with his family and be with his children more as they grew up.

In 2012, Yen returned to the movie industry and commenced the filming of Special ID, in which he played the main lead, an undercover cop, and also took on the role of action choreographer. In 2013, it was reported that Donnie Yen would be playing the lead role for The Iceman Cometh 3D, a sci-fi action film dealing with time travel and which was filmed in 3D. Yen confirmed that MMA would be used in both of the aforementioned films.

In February 2013, the Weinstein Company confirmed that it had purchased the rights to Crouching Tiger, Hidden Dragon sequel and contacted Yen to play the male lead. In March 2013, Hong Kong magazines surfaced photos of Harvey and Bob Weinstein traveling to Hong Kong to meet with Yen and persuade him to accept the offer. It was reported that Yen was considering the role and quoted as saying, "The first is that my schedule this year is very packed. The second is that the first film is already such a classic. I am afraid of the pressure, that the original cannot be surpassed."

In May 2013, during the annual Cannes Film Festival, the Weinstein Company announced that Yen would play the lead role of Silent Wolf in the Crouching Tiger sequel, titled Crouching Tiger, Hidden Dragon: Sword of Destiny, alongside leading female action star Michelle Yeoh reprising her role as Yu Shu Lien, and with director Yuen Woo-ping, Yen's mentor. It was revealed that the movie would be filmed in both English and Mandarin to appeal to the international market.

It was also revealed during the Crouching Tiger, Hidden Dragon II press conference that the Weinstein Company had obtained rights to Akira Kurosawa's Seven Samurai, was planning a remake and was negotiating with Yen, George Clooney, and Zhang Ziyi to star in the film. Donnie Yen declined the offer due to scheduling conflicts for the filming of Ip Man 3.

In late March 2015, Ip Man 3 was announced. Yen reprised his role as the titular character, Bruce Lee's martial arts master, Ip Man. Retired boxer and former heavyweight champion Mike Tyson was confirmed to join the cast. Donnie Yen mentioned that he was a big fan of Mike Tyson, watched many of his professional boxing bouts, and was excited to work with him. Mike Tyson stated during a press conference that he was a huge fan of Donnie Yen and has watched the first two Ip Man movies more than three times each and was honored to be invited for the final installment of the trilogy.

Principal photography for Ip Man 3 began on March 25, 2015, and the finished movie was released in December 2015 in parts of Asia and around the world in early 2016 to generally favorable reviews.

From 2016 to 2020 

In 2016, Yen co-starred in the Star Wars anthology film Rogue One as Chirrut Îmwe, the Zatoichi-like blind transient warrior. On February 12, 2016, it was confirmed that Yen would replace Jet Li in the role of Xiang in the upcoming action film XXX: Return of Xander Cage.

For the promotion of XXX: Return of Xander Cage, Paramount focused marketing efforts on Donnie Yen in China and most parts of Asia, placing him at the front of the film posters ahead of Vin Diesel, and shared clips and reviews of Yen's performance in the movie on the popular Chinese social media site Weibo. Paramount's efforts worked very well in China. Return of Xander Cage was number one in its opening weekend with $61.9 million, and crossed the $100 million mark in just six days with $22.2m coming from Valentine's Day alone after rave reviews praising Donnie Yen's performance swept through Chinese social media, driving moviegoers to the cinema.

Yen's performance in both Rogue One and XXX: Return of Xander Cage received extremely positive responses from critics and general audiences. For Return of Xander Cage, many media sites including Variety, Los Angeles Times, Screen Anarchy and Budomate praised Yen's performance and credited him as the highlight of the movie and stealing every scene he is in. In the case of Rogue One, other than praises from critics, Yen's performance was also applauded by audiences worldwide. In an official poll on the Star Wars webpage, in which more 40,000 people voted, Yen's character Chirrut Îmwe was voted as audiences' favorite Rogue One character.

While Yen was filming XXX: Return of Xander Cage in Canada, he received many offers from Hollywood studios and directors. At the same time, Hong Kong director Wong Jing personally flew to Canada to invite Yen to star in his film Chasing the Dragon, a remake of the award-winning film To be Number One. Yen eventually accepted the offer and played a non-traditional role of a villain with limited fighting scenes and the opportunity to work alongside Andy Lau.

In September 2017, Chasing the Dragon was released with extremely positive reviews from critics, citing Yen's versatility as an actor and his incredible portrayal of the late Ng Sek Ho, the main character of the film. Chasing the Dragon was also a huge hit with audiences in most parts of Asia. In Hong Kong, Chasing the Dragon is ranked as one of the top 5 Hong Kong films in 2017.

In 2017, Yen received a call from old friend Jet Li and Alibaba CEO Jack Ma about a potential collaboration on a short martial arts film known as Gong Shou Dao - to promote a new form of Taiji as an olympic sport in the future. Yen was on holiday with his wife to celebrate their anniversary, but cancelled his plans to take part in the film. Yen declined any salary for this participation for GSD as he stated that "friendship is not measured by money" and that he hopes his participation can help promote Chinese martial arts to worldwide audiences. In return, Jet Li and Jack Ma surprised Yen and his wife Cissy, by helping to celebrate their wedding anniversary on the set. The full GSD 20 minutes short film was released on 11 November - China's Singles' Day, debuting on Youku and Jet Li's official Facebook page, garnering a total of more than 100 million views worldwide. Netizens in China praised Yen's speed and technique in the film, with most audiences (over 190,000) voting Yen as the highlight of the short film.

In late 2017, Yen began filming Big Brother, a mixed martial arts film where Yen plays a high school teacher with unconventional methods and a dark past.

In 2017, a live-action film adaption of the video game Sleeping Dogs was announced, with Yen playing the lead character Wei Shen. In February 2018, Yen confirmed the continued production of the film through social media.

In 2019, Yen reprised his role as Ip Man for the final time in Ip Man 4: The Finale. During the Hong Kong protests of that year, protesters urged a boycott of the film, citing the pro-Beijing stances of Yen, co-star Danny Chan, and producer Raymond Wong. Nonetheless, the film was a box office success, grossing over three times its budget of $52 million and becoming the highest-grossing Chinese film of all time in Malaysia as well as the third-highest-grossing Chinese film in North America in five years.
In March 2020, as part of the press tour for Disney's live-action remake of Mulan, when Yen was asked by reporters whether he was interested in appearing in a superhero movie, Yen revealed that he had been offered a role in Warner Brothers' Justice League and Aquaman films by Zack Snyder, but turned it down due to a scheduling conflict. The role offered was that of Nuidis Vulko, which eventually went to Willem Dafoe.

Martial arts history, style and philosophy
Yen describes himself as a mixed martial artist. He learned Shaolin Kung Fu and Wudang quan from a young age under his mother's tutelage.  He then wanted to learn Taekwondo in his teenage years, earning a 6th Dan in the process. At the time, the Beijing Wushu Team had a scout in the United States and invited Yen over to Beijing, China, where he began training at the Beijing Sports Institute, the same facility where champion-turned-actor Jet Li trained; this is where the two of them crossed paths for the first time.

Upon his return to the United States, Yen won gold medals in various wushu competitions.

Yen later went on to discover and seek knowledge on other martial arts styles; he would later obtain black and purple belts from Judo and  Brazilian Jiu-Jitsu, respectively, and went on to study Parkour, Wrestling, Muay Thai, Kickboxing, and Boxing under various trainers. His exposure to Mixed Martial Arts (MMA) was heightened when he went back to the United States from 2000 to 2003. While making his Hollywood debut, he also took time off to learn the various martial arts forms. Yen's progress was evident when he returned to Asia, where he implemented his newfound knowledge of MMA, showcased in films such as SPL: Sha Po Lang (2005), Flash Point (2007), and Special ID (2013).

Near the end of 2007, Yen added a new martial arts system to his arsenal. He was offered the role of Wing Chun grandmaster and mentor of film star Bruce Lee, Ip Man, in a 2008 film named after the grandmaster. He worked hard and studied Wing Chun under Ip Man's eldest son, Ip Chun, for 9 months before tackling the role. Ip Chun has since praised Yen for his effort, his skills as a martial artist, and his ability to grasp the full concept of Wing Chun much faster than anyone else he has taught.

Yen believes that combining many martial arts together will produce the most effective and harmonious style. Yen has said, "When you watch my films, you're feeling my heart." He believes in practical combat, and in his opinion, MMA is the most authentic type of practical combat.

Yen was a rebel in his youth due to the huge expectations and pressures from his parents, as his mother is the founder of the Chinese Wushu Research Institute in Boston, and his father was a scholar and a musician. Yen joined a Chinatown gang in Boston in his early years. He was a very curious teenager who sought to exchange martial arts knowledge with people from different martial arts backgrounds, which led to him gaining profound knowledge in practical martial arts and having a reputation as a street brawler.

Other martial arts stars such as Jackie Chan and Jet Li have also stated that Yen may be the best fighter in terms of practical combat in the Asian cinematic universe.

World class fighters, such as former Strikeforce Middleweight Champion Cung Le and former World Boxing Heavyweight Champion Mike Tyson, who have worked with Donnie Yen in the films Bodyguards and Assassins and Ip Man 3, respectively, have both claimed that Yen is an incredible martial artist and would do well in authentic combat. While filming Ip Man 3, crew members were worried that Tyson, who had been a professional boxer, would accidentally injure Yen. However, it was ultimately Yen who fractured Tyson's finger while using his elbow to block Tyson's punches. Tyson insisted on finishing the scene before he was treated in hospital.

Action choreography
Donnie Yen was considered one of the premiere action choreographers in the world, having been invited by Hollywood to choreograph blockbusters such as Blade II, Highlander: Endgame, and Shanghai Knights. In Asia, he is the action choreographer for most of his movies and has won multiple awards for his action choreography.

Yen's most famous works include films such as Flash Point and SPL: Sha Po Lang. He has mentioned that the main differences in filmmaking in Asia and Hollywood are with regards to freedom and control. In Asia, the action choreographer takes over the scene during the fight scene. This means that for action scenes filmed in Asia, the choreographer becomes the director and is in full control over camera placements, camera angles, and the relationship between the drama and the action; therefore the main director is not needed at all. While in Hollywood, on the other hand, Yen explains that the action choreographer simply choreographs the actions with the director, who still maintains full control of such settings and camera angles.

Yen's work as a choreographer won him the Hong Kong Film Award for Best Action Choreography at the 27th Hong Kong Film Awards and the Golden Horse Award for Best Action Choreography at the 2008 and 2011 Golden Horse Awards.

Yen was the fight choreographer for the 2010 film Legend of the Fist: The Return of Chen Zhen. For this film, Yen mentioned that he included Jeet Kune Do elements as a tribute to Bruce Lee, who played Chen Zhen in the 1972 film Fist of Fury. Furthermore, he incorporated many MMA elements in the film, coupled with the utilisation of Wing Chun. Yen also stated that the concept behind Bruce Lee's Jeet Kune Do is similar to that of MMA, hence the incorporation of many forms of martial arts was a necessity in the film.

He won the Hong Kong Film Award for Best Action Choreography four times, being one of the most frequent winners of this coveted award. He has won awards for his choreography in films such as The Twins Effect, SPL: Sha Po Lang, Flash Point, and Kung Fu Jungle. Although uncredited, Donnie Yen was also action co-choreographer for Hong Kong Film Award winners such as Ip Man, Ip Man 2, and Bodyguards and Assassins.

Bodybuilding and transformation for roles

Yen is renowned for his physical fitness, strength, and speed achieved through his use of a strict and disciplined fitness regime.

However, despite his muscular build, Yen has gained tremendous attention for his dedication to his roles and for the lengths to which he goes to achieve the physical build and appearance of the characters he plays. In 2007, Yen lost over 14 kg (30 pounds) to reach the weight of 54 kg (120 pounds) to better portray the slender Ip Man and the techniques of wing chun, which focuses on techniques and not strength. He did so through a very strict regimen of limiting himself to a plain diet consisting mainly of vegetables.

In 2010, still fresh off Ip Man 2, Yen was cast as Chen Zhen in Legend of the Fist: The Return of Chen Zhen, which was originally portrayed by Bruce Lee. He had to regain his muscular physique for the role and took 6 months through a precise and dedicated diet routine. He maintained this bulk and physique while filming The Lost Bladesman, in which he plays Guan Yu, a Chinese general known for his size and spear-fighting abilities.

In 2015, Yen reduced his muscular physique yet again to reprise the role of Ip Man in Ip Man 3 and for his role as the blind warrior monk Chirrut Îmwe in Rogue One. For his role as Xiang in XXX: Return of Xander Cage opposite Vin Diesel, Yen rebuilt his physique.

Personal life
Yen met his first wife and Hong Kong advertising executive, Leung Zing-ci, in 1990. The couple began dating in 1990. After three years of dating, they married secretly in the United States in November 1993. The marriage ended in less than a year. After their divorce was finalized, Leung realized that she was pregnant with their son, Jeff, who was born in 1995.

Yen later married former beauty queen Cissy Wang after three months of dating in 2003. The couple have two children, Jasmine and James.

Yen has stated that he is a big fan of the MMA organization Ultimate Fighting Championship and has watched almost every UFC event available. In various interviews, he has mentioned that he would have loved to compete in the Ultimate Fighting Championship if he did not have a recurring shoulder injury.

Philanthropic work
In 2012, Donnie Yen and his wife Cissy Wang co-founded Go.Asia, an online charity platform encouraging people to participate in charity work and serve local communities.

In October 2014, Donnie Yen was invited to be a guest speaker in front of a crowd of 20,000 youths for WE Day Vancouver, where he spoke about the hardships he faced growing up and how he overcame difficulties to become the reigning martial arts star.

In 2015, Yen visited refugee camps in Thailand, bringing donations and gifts for the refugees. Yen is also an ambassador for the international charity Save the Children.

In December 2015, Yen established a charitable fund, Yen's Honour Protection Fund, with the purpose of empowering celebrities to use the law to defend their honor and reputation. Yen said the fund "[seeks] to assist and render help to everyone who needs it, most importantly to heal and repair the hearts and dignities which have been affected." This fund was established after Yen won a lawsuit against Geng Weiguo (AKA Tan Bing), who defamed Yen and hired netizens to threaten Yen's family.

In February 2020, in light of the coronavirus pandemic in China and the rest of the world, Donnie Yen stepped in to donate HK$1 million to frontline medical workers in Wuhan. He also produced and dedicated a short clip to thank all medical workers in China in their fight against the coronavirus; the clip was uploaded  on Chinese social media site, Weibo, where Yen has over 11 million followers. He also donated a painting done by himself and his two children, to the frontline medical workers.

Politics
In 2023, Yen was appointed to the Chinese People's Political Consultative Conference as a representative of the "Literature and Arts" sector, replacing outgoing fellow action star Jackie Chan. He stated that he was a Chinese patriot and requested that his film roles in Hollywood must positively represent the Chinese.

Yen said of the 2019–2020 Hong Kong protests that it was not a protest, "It was a riot."

Filmography

Awards and nominations

References

External links

 
 
 "An Action Star Moves to the Lead," New York Times article
 Donnie Yen profile page at Hong Kong Cinemagic

 
1963 births
Living people
20th-century Hong Kong male actors
21st-century Hong Kong male actors
Action choreographers
Chinese philanthropists
Chinese Jeet Kune Do practitioners
Chinese Wing Chun practitioners
Film directors from Guangdong
Hong Kong emigrants to the United States
Hong Kong expatriates in the United States
Hong Kong film directors
Hong Kong film producers
Hong Kong hapkido practitioners
Hong Kong kung fu practitioners
Hong Kong male film actors
Hong Kong male judoka
Hong Kong male karateka
Hong Kong male kickboxers
Hong Kong male taekwondo practitioners
Hong Kong male television actors
Hong Kong martial artists
Hong Kong Muay Thai practitioners
Hong Kong philanthropists
Hong Kong practitioners of Brazilian jiu-jitsu
Hong Kong stunt performers
Hong Kong wushu practitioners
Male actors from Guangdong
Male actors from Guangzhou
Sportspeople from Guangdong
Sportspeople from Guangzhou
Wing Chun practitioners from Hong Kong
Members of the 14th Chinese People's Political Consultative Conference